Jonathan Peale House is a historic home located near Harrisonburg, Rockingham County, Virginia. It was built about 1845, and is a two-story, five bay, central-passage plan brick dwelling in the Greek Revival style.  The front facade feature a central two-story gabled portico supported by stucco-covered Tuscan order columns. On the rear facade is a two-story, full-width gallery porch supported by stucco-covered masonry columns. Also on the property are the contributing well, slave quarter, and tennis court.  The house was used as Confederate General Stonewall Jackson’s headquarters in April 1862.

It was listed on the National Register of Historic Places in 2007.

References

Houses on the National Register of Historic Places in Virginia
Greek Revival houses in Virginia
Houses completed in 1845
Houses in Rockingham County, Virginia
National Register of Historic Places in Rockingham County, Virginia
1845 establishments in Virginia